The Sandford Dugout is a dugout house in Sioux County, Nebraska. Pioneer Joseph L. Sandford built the house in 1897 on a homestead claim. His dugout, like most pioneer dugouts, was carved into the side of a hill. Settlers in the Great Plains commonly built dugout houses or sod homes at the time, as more conventional building materials were difficult to obtain in the region. However, the dugouts were usually considered temporary homes and ultimately abandoned; as a result, most of them fell into disrepair, and the Sandford Dugout is likely the only intact dugout remaining in Nebraska. The Sandford property also contained a house, a barn, a well, a privy, and two corrals; these structures have largely been replaced or demolished, and the location of the well and privy are unknown.

The dugout was added to the National Register of Historic Places on March 9, 2000.

References

Dugouts
Houses on the National Register of Historic Places in Nebraska
Houses completed in 1897
Houses in Sioux County, Nebraska
National Register of Historic Places in Sioux County, Nebraska